The Lay Mission-Helpers Association (LMH) was founded in 1955 by Msgr. Anthony Brouwers. LMH provides training and support for lay Catholics who serve three years in mission dioceses around the world. Since its founding LMH has sent more than 700 single men and women, married couples, and families to serve in 36 countries. Teachers, nurses, social workers, computer technicians, administrators, tradesman, and others work together and strive to live a simple life close to the poor. Lay Mission-Helpers serve to share their gifts, live their faith, and learn from one another. Catholic doctors interested in serving in Africa or Latin America can serve with LMH's sister organization, Mission Doctors Association.

Requirements for admission
 Be a practicing Catholic involved in his/her local Church and community,
 Be a U.S. citizen,
 Have a college degree and/or professional skill needed in the missions,
 Have good mental and physical health,
 Be 21 to 62 years of age,
 Be willing to make a 3-year commitment,
 Have a commitment to work and live with the poor,
 Participate in the 4-month Formation Program in Los Angeles.

References

External links
 Official LMH website

Catholic missionary orders